Russell J. Crane (1906/1907 - March 18, 1966) was an American college football player and coach and boxer. He was a prominent guard for coach Robert Zuppke's Illinois Fighting Illini, captain in 1929.

Crane was an assistant football coach at the University of Richmond from 1935 to 1938.  He turned to Richmond as line coach and head track coach in 1946.

He died of pulmonary heart disease in Monongalia County, West Virginia, on March 18, 1966, at age 59.

References

1900s births
1966 deaths
American football guards
Illinois Fighting Illini football players
Richmond Spiders football coaches
Washington and Lee Generals football coaches
West Virginia Mountaineers football coaches
Richmond Spiders track and field coaches
All-American college football players